The following list is of the episodes in the first series of the British children's television series Sadie J, which stars Georgia Lock, Ronan Carter and Priyanka Patel. It first aired on 14 January 2011.

Series Overview

Series 1 (2011)

Series 2 (2012)
A second series was filmed in Summer 2011. Series 2 premiered on Wednesday 25 January 2012 at 5.15pm. All of Series 2 was broadcast in HD on BBC HD.

Series 3 (2013)
A third series was first announced by Georgia Lock via Twitter. Production began in Summer 2012. The third series began airing on 23 January 2013.

References

Sadie J